Winaq is a left-wing political party in Guatemala whose most notable member is Rigoberta Menchú, who is ethnically Kʼicheʼ. Its name comes from the Kʼicheʼean word for "people" or "humanity", "winaq". It is a party whose roots are in the indigenous communities of Guatemala.

Ideology
According to the party's website,

In a working paper of a seminar organised by FLACSO Guatemala and the Friedrich Ebert Foundation written in 2007, it was concluded that Winaq had an ambiguous ideology, trying to combine adversarial interest. Later, after committing to an alliance with other left-wing parties, the party developed a more pronounced left-wing perspective with eco-socialist leanings. The party is known for its political activism to prohibit infrastructure projects that threaten natural goods, especially rivers and water quality.

History

Formation and early results
In the 2007 general elections, Winaq's pro-formation committee participated with the Encuentro por Guatemala party, nominating Rigoberta Menchú as presidential candidate. The alliance came in seventh place in the presidential elections. The alliance fared slightly better at the legislative elections gathering 6.18% of the national vote and 4 seats.
In 2008 the party finally secured enough affiliates to register as a legal party, which was heralded by the Guatemala Times, as “one of the most important steps ever achieved by a Mayan political leader in Guatemala.”

Entering the Broad Front of the Left coalition
In the 2011 general elections, the Guatemalan left created an alliance called Frente Amplio, made up of the political parties Unidad Revolucionaria Nacional Guatemalteca (URNG-MAIZ), Alternativa Nueva Nación (ANN), Winaq and the pro-formation committee of the Movimiento Nueva República (MNR). Rigoberta Menchú was unanimously proclaimed as presidential candidate and Anibal García as vice presidential candidate. They obtained around 3% of the vote. The party sat in opposition to the Molina government and played a leading role in his eventual resignation, when Congressman Amilcar Pop brought up a lawsuit against Molina on 24 April 2015. In return the Congressman received multiple death threats for his anti-corruption work in the legislature.

The coalition was maintained for the  elections in 2015, wherein the party ran with Miguel Ángel Sandoval and Mario Ellintong as president and vice-president respectively, receiving about 2% of the vote. In the congressional elections the alliance actually gained votes and gathered 4.36% of the national vote, yet lost 3 mandates in the Congress.

Coalition split
Ahead of the 2019 elections the alliance split up, forcing the party to run on its own. Even so the party was able to muster 3.51% of the vote, granting it 4 seats in the chamber. Its presidential ticket with Manuel Villacorta as head and Izabel Hernández as vice-president reached their best result in party history, coming sixth with 5.27% of the vote. During his presidential campaign Villacorta focused on corruption, the fight against poverty through wealth redistribution and infrastructure development.
After the elections the party largely opposed the government of Giammattei and supported the mining protests occurring in El Estor since October 2021.

Restored left-wing alliance
On 7 June 2022 party leadership released a statement, concurring with Sandoval's appeal for a new coalition of left-wing forces that can challenge the current governing forces. Since the current electoral law favours smaller parties, it has not yet been decided what form this new alliance will take. At the end of January, URNG and Winaq made their renewed alliance public and proclaimed Amílcar Pop and Mónica Enríquez as their presidential ticket for the upcoming elections.
The parties also planned to involve Semilla in their effort to win the mayorship of Guatemala City.

Election results

Congress of the Republic

President of the Republic of Guatemala

Notes

References

Democratic socialist parties in North America
Foro de São Paulo
Indigenist political parties in North America
Political parties established in 2008
Socialist parties in Guatemala